Arenda Grimberg (born 10 March 1978) is a Dutch racing cyclist born in Almelo. She participates in both road cycling as cyclo-cross. In 2002, she became Dutch national champion in road racing. She represented her nation at the 1999, 2000, 2001, 2002, 2003, 2004 and 2005 UCI Road World Championships.

Honours

Road cycling
1998 : 3rd in Damesronde van Drenthe
2002 : 1st in Dutch Elite National Championships
2003 : 3rd in Ronde van Gelderland
2004 : 3rd in Ronde van Gelderland
2004 : 3rd in Holland Hills Classic
2005 : 3rd in Omloop Door Middag-Humsterland
2005 : 3rd in Holland Hills Classic
2008 & 2010 : 1st Profronde van Almelo

Cyclo-cross
2004 : 3rd in Gieten
2005 : 3rd in Sint-Michielsgestel
2006 : 1st in Sint-Michielsgestel (2006/07 Cyclo-cross Superprestige)

References

External links

Living people
1978 births
Dutch female cyclists
Cyclo-cross cyclists
Sportspeople from Almelo
UCI Road World Championships cyclists for the Netherlands
Cyclists from Overijssel
21st-century Dutch women